Bernd Karbacher and Andrei Olhovskiy were the defending champions, but Olhovskiy did not participate this year.  Karbacher partnered Alex Antonitsch, losing in the semifinals.

Jan Apell and Jonas Björkman won the title, defeating Jacco Eltingh and Paul Haarhuis 6–4, 7–6 in the final.

Seeds

  Jacco Eltingh /  Paul Haarhuis (final)
  Jan Apell /  Jonas Björkman (champions)
  Marc-Kevin Goellner /  Javier Sánchez (semifinals)
  Jeremy Bates /  Jan Siemerink (first round)

Draw

Draw

References
Draw

Men's Doubles